Nigerian Academy of Engineering was  founded in 1997 by concerned professional Nigerian engineers, with the aim to promote engineering training and practice in Nigeria as an effort to improve the technological growth of Nigeria as a developing country in West-Africa.
The Academy was described as a Think Tank for Engineering and Technology in Nigeria with focus on researches and studies across the field of engineering.

Notable members
Members of the academy are distinguish Nigerian engineers. 
Presently there are 143 members across  all disciplines in engineering.
Notable members of the Academy includes:
Akinsola Olusegun Faluyi
Abubakar Sani Sambo
Danladi Slim Matawal
Ebele Ofunneamaka Okeke
Edet James Amana
Ernest Ndukwe
Eli Jidere Bala
Franklin Erepamo Osaisai
Joseph Atubokiki Ajienka
Micheal Oladimeji Faborede
Nicholas Agiobi Damachi
Oyewusi Ibidapo Obe
Ogbonnaya Onu
Olawale Adeniji Ige
Azikiwe Peter Onwualu 
Rahmon Ade Bello
Samuel Olatunde Fadahunsi
Salihu Mustafa
Umar Buba Bindir

See also
List of notable engineers in Nigeria

References

Professional associations based in Nigeria